Introducing the Minutemen is a retrospective and relatively comprehensive compilation of songs by influential punk/alternative trio the Minutemen, compiled by bassist and notable solo artist Mike Watt twelve years after the untimely demise of the band. The album is made up of tracks spanning the band's entire career, sampling tracks from all of their studio releases with the exception of the Tour-Spiel EP and the Black Flag-Minutemen collaboration Minuteflag. Due to the comprehensive and wide-spanning nature of the collection, it is generally perceived to be an effective introduction to The Minutemen and their music.

The band's landmark breakthrough Double Nickels on the Dime donates the most tracks, with seven. The three-song Joy EP and the rarities collection The Politics of Time both contribute a mere two tracks.

Track listing

Personnel
Minutemen
D. Boon – guitar, vocals, production
Mike Watt – bass, vocals, production
George Hurley – drums
Technical
Spot – production, engineering
Ethan James – production, engineering
Joe Carducci – production, engineering

Introducing The Minutemen
Albums produced by Spot (producer)
Introducing The Minutemen
Introducing The Minutemen